Fra diavolo (from Fra Diavolo, Italian for "Brother Devil”) is a spicy Italian-American tomato sauce for pasta or seafood, made with crushed red pepper, garlic, and fresh herbs like parsley and basil. The sauce is made by sauteing chopped onions in olive oil, then adding tomatoes (canned or fresh), crushed red pepper and garlic. Some recipes add white wine. Some versions of Chicken Fra Diavolo are made without tomato sauce. 

It is unclear how "Fra" became attached to the name of a deviled (i.e. spicy) sauce, but the name was possibly influenced either by the nickname of celebrated Italian guerilla/bandit Michele Pezza, or the opera of the same name by Daniel Auber.

References

Italian-American cuisine
Sauces
Tomato dishes
American seafood dishes
Pasta dishes
American chicken dishes